Edburga (minor planet designation: 413 Edburga) is a typical Main belt asteroid. It was discovered by Max Wolf on 7 January 1896 at Heidelberg Observatory. The origin of the name is unknown. Its orbital plane is inclined at an angle of 18.7° to the plane of the ecliptic.

This is consistent with prior results. This is classified as an M-type asteroid in the Tholen system and X-type in the Bus and Binzel taxonomy, with a moderate albedo and generally featureless near infrared spectra. An absorption feature has been detected at a wavelength 3 μm, suggesting this is W-type. Radar echoes are bimodal, suggesting a bifurcated structure that is likely a contact binary.

References

External links 
 Lightcurve plot of 413 Edburga, Palmer Divide Observatory, B. D. Warner (2011)
 Asteroid Lightcurve Database (LCDB), query form (info )
 Dictionary of Minor Planet Names, Google books
 Asteroids and comets rotation curves, CdR – Observatoire de Genève, Raoul Behrend
 Discovery Circumstances: Numbered Minor Planets (1)-(5000) – Minor Planet Center
 
 

Background asteroids
Edburga
Edburga
M-type asteroids (Tholen)
X-type asteroids (SMASS)
18960107